Casazza (formerly Mologno) is a comune (municipality) in the Province of Bergamo in the Italian region of Lombardy, located about  northeast of Milan and about  northeast of Bergamo.

Casazza borders the following municipalities: Albino, Gaverina Terme, Grone, Monasterolo del Castello, Spinone al Lago, Vigano San Martino.

Demographic evolution

References

External links